Gucun Park, formerly Gucun, is an interchange station between Line 7 and Line 15 on Shanghai Metro. It began operation on 28 December 2010. It became an interchange station with Line 15 when it opened on 23 January 2021, and serves as the northern terminus of Line 15. 

The station is located in Gucun town, in Shanghai's Baoshan District.

Station layout

Gallery

References

Railway stations in Shanghai
Line 7, Shanghai Metro
Line 15, Shanghai Metro
Shanghai Metro stations in Baoshan District
Railway stations in China opened in 2010